Braeside is a railroad station in Highland Park, Illinois serving Metra's Union Pacific North Line, in the Braeside neighborhood of Highland Park. It is located at 10 North St. Johns Avenue, just off Lake Cook Road. In Metra's zone-based fare schedule, Braeside is located in Zone E. As of 2018, Braeside is the 117th busiest of Metra's 236 non-downtown stations, with an average of 410 weekday boardings. Cook County Forest Preserves' Turnbull Woods and William N. Erickson Preserve are adjacent to the station, and the Chicago Botanic Garden is a mile away. Braeside Station has a warming hut on the inbound side of the track.
The station is named after a nearby school.
The station consists of two platforms and a waiting room/warming hut, but does not contain a ticket agent booth or restroom facilities. Northbound trains stop on the west platform and southbound trains stop on the east platform. Trains go south to Chicago’s Ogilvie Transportation Center, and as far north as Kenosha, Wisconsin.

As of 2022, Braeside is served by 23 inbound trains and 21 outbound trains on weekdays, by 11 trains in each direction on Saturdays, and by eight trains in each direction on Sundays.

Bus connections
Pace
  628 Braeside Shuttle Bug 8 
  629 Braeside Shuttle Bug 9 
  640 Braeside Station/Commercial Avenue Shuttle Bug

References

External links
Metra - Braeside station
Station from County Line Road from Google Maps Street View

Metra stations in Illinois
Former Chicago and North Western Railway stations
Railway stations in Lake County, Illinois
Union Pacific North Line